Olav Aase (13 June 1914 – 26 August 1992) was a Norwegian politician for the Labour Party. He was born in Flekkefjord.

He served as a deputy representative to the Norwegian Parliament from the Market towns of Vest-Agder and Rogaland counties during the term 1945–1949. On the local level, Aase was a member of Flekkefjord municipality council during the terms 1937–1940, 1959–1963 and 1963–1967.

Among other things he worked in newspapers, being the editor-in-chief of Agder Folkeblad in 1949.

References

1914 births
1992 deaths
Deputy members of the Storting
Labour Party (Norway) politicians
Vest-Agder politicians
Norwegian newspaper editors
20th-century Norwegian writers
People from Flekkefjord